The 2013–14 Marist Red Foxes men's basketball team represented Marist College during the 2013–14 NCAA Division I men's basketball season. The Red Foxes, led by first year head coach Jeff Bower, played their home games at the McCann Arena and were members of the Metro Atlantic Athletic Conference. They finished the season 12–19, 9–11 in MAAC play to finish in a three way tie for sixth place. They lost in the first round of the MAAC tournament to Niagara. On June 2, 2014, head coach Jeff Bower resigned after one season to take the General manager position with the Detroit Pistons. On June 17, 2014, Marist hired Mike Maker as their new head coach.

Previous season 

The Red Foxes finished the 2012–13 season 10–21, 6–12 in MAAC play to finish in eighth place. They lost in the first round of the MAAC tournament to Siena. On March 14, 2013, head coach Chuck Martin was fired. On April 10, 2013, Marist hired Jeff Bower as their new head coach.

Roster

Schedule

|-
!colspan=9 style="background:#E51837; color:#FFFFFF;"| Regular season

|-
!colspan=9 style="background:#E51837; color:#FFFFFF;"| 2014 MAAC tournament

References

Marist Red Foxes men's basketball seasons
Marist